Bartrumella kaawaensis is a species of sea snail, a marine gastropod mollusk in the family Pyramidellidae, the pyrams and their allies. It is the type species of the genus Bartrumella.

References

External links
 Bartrumella kaawaensil illustration of type species

Pyramidellidae
Gastropods described in 1940